P2Y purinoceptor 2 is a protein that in humans is encoded by the P2RY2 gene.

The product of this gene, P2Y2 belongs to the family of G-protein coupled receptors. This family has several receptor subtypes with different pharmacological selectivity, which overlaps in some cases, for various adenosine and uridine nucleotides. This receptor is responsive to both adenosine and uridine nucleotides. It may participate in control of the cell cycle of endometrial carcinoma cells. Three transcript variants encoding the same protein have been identified for this gene.

See also
 P2Y receptor
 Denufosol, a P2Y2 agonist

References

Further reading

External links

G protein-coupled receptors